Megyeri is a Hungarian surname. Notable people with the surname include:

Balázs Megyeri (born 1990), Hungarian footballer
Boglárka Megyeri (born 1987), Hungarian footballer
Márta Megyeri (born 1952), Hungarian handball player
Matthias Megyeri (born 1973), German artist

See also
Megyeri Bridge, a bridge in Budapest, Hungary

Hungarian-language surnames